Simon Hose (born 13 April 1967) is a former Australian rules footballer who played with the Brisbane Bears in the Victorian Football League (VFL).

Hose caught the eye of VFL recruiters with his performances in the 1986 Teal Cup and was signed by the Sydney Swans. He was never able to break into the seniors and went to Brisbane through the 1989 Pre-season Draft.

His VFL debut finally came in 1989 and was in a win over his former club.  He played perhaps his best game for the Bears when they played Footscray at Carrara, kicking two goals from his 22 disposals.

References

External links
 
 

1967 births
Australian rules footballers from Queensland
Brisbane Bears players
Western Magpies Australian Football Club players
Living people